Karolj "Karlo" Kasap "Kaszap Károly  (August 5, 1954 in Ada) is a Yugoslav/Serbian  and later Canadian former wrestler who competed in the 1980 Summer Olympics and 1984 Summer Olympics for Yugoslavia and 1992 Summer Olympics for Canada.

References

External links
 

1954 births
Living people
Serbian male sport wrestlers
Yugoslav male sport wrestlers
Olympic wrestlers of Yugoslavia
Olympic wrestlers of Canada
Wrestlers at the 1980 Summer Olympics
Wrestlers at the 1984 Summer Olympics
Wrestlers at the 1992 Summer Olympics
Canadian male sport wrestlers
People from Ada, Serbia
World Wrestling Championships medalists
European Wrestling Championships medalists